Szidónia Puhalák (born 5 July 1996) is a Hungarian handballer who plays for Siófok KC.   

She made her international debut on 22 March 2018 against Netherlands.

Achievements 
EHF Champions League:
Winner: 2017, 2018, 2019
Nemzeti Bajnokság I:
Winner: 2017, 2018, 2019
Magyar Kupa:
Winner: 2018, 2019, 2021

References
   

    
1996 births
Living people
Sportspeople from Szeged
Győri Audi ETO KC players